Telmanove Raion is one of the administrative raions (a district) of Donetsk Oblast, located in southeastern Ukraine. The raion was abolished on 18 July 2020 as part of the administrative reform of Ukraine, which reduced the number of raions of Donetsk Oblast to eight. However, since 2014 much of the raion was not under control of Ukrainian government and has been part of the Donetsk People's Republic which continues using it as an administrative unit. The administrative center of the raion is located in the urban-type settlement of Telmanove.

History
The raion has been named after the German Communist leader Ernst Thälmann.

As the result of the 1951 Polish–Soviet territorial exchange, the Soviet authorities deported and resettled approximately 400 families of Boykos from the village of Chorna (today Czarna in Poland), the former Nyzhni Ustryky Raion of Drohobych Oblast that was transferred to Poland.

On 9 December 2014, the Verkhovna Rada, Ukraine's national parliament, changed the boundaries and total area of Telmanove Raion to encompass . The district's administration buildings and government was moved to the Myrne urban-type settlement following the events surrounding the War in Donbas.

A small part of the raion on the west bank of the Kalmius river was under Ukrainian army control, from the north city of Starohnativka to the south city of Mykolaivka. To facilitate the administration, the government transferred this area to other administrative units, so that the amended area of the raion until 2020 was under control of the Donetsk People's Republic.

In 2016, Ukraine's national parliament, the Verkhovna Rada, renamed Telmanove Raion into Boikivske Raion and Telmanove to Boikivske, in memory of the Boykos people, who were deported from Czarna, Bieszczady County (today in Poland) after the 1951 Polish–Soviet territorial exchange. The Donetsk People's Republic continues to recognize the old name.

Geography
Telmanove Raion bordered Novoazovsk Raion to its south, Nikolske Raion to its southwest, Volnovakha Raion to its west, Starobesheve Raion to its north. From the east, the raion is bounded by the international Russia–Ukraine border.

Administrative divisions
The district is divided into three settlement councils and twelve rural councils.

Demographics
According to the 2001 Ukrainian Census:

Note: Urums are Turkic speaking Greeks. Many of them were deported here with the First annexation of Crimea by the Russian Empire (1784) from Balaklava, on the Crimean Peninsula, once a cultural center for Pontic Greeks (see also Mariupol Greek).

Gallery

References

Former raions of Donetsk Oblast
Soviet toponymy in Ukraine
1923 establishments in Ukraine
Ukrainian raions abolished during the 2020 administrative reform